Christoffel Abraham (Bram) Koopman  (born 13 February 1917 in Den Helder – died 4 October 2008 in Alkmaar) was a Dutch politician of the Labour Party (PvdA).

He was a member of the Senate from 1971 to 1978. He was also a member of the provincial parliament of North Holland.

He studied economics at the Vrije Universiteit until 1960 and received his promotion at the University of Amsterdam in economical sciences in 1977.

References 
  Parlement.com biography

1917 births
2008 deaths
Labour Party (Netherlands) politicians
Members of the Senate (Netherlands)
Members of the Provincial Council of North Holland
People from Den Helder
Vrije Universiteit Amsterdam alumni
University of Amsterdam alumni